Two hospital ships bore the name Letitia:

, which served during World War I
, which served during World War II

Ship names